A blood plasma substitute may refer to:
An artificially made substance designed to have one or more of the vast amount of functions of the contents of the blood plasma
Volume expander (although providing volume is only one of many functions of blood plasma)